The 1992 America East men's basketball tournament was hosted by the higher seeds in head-to-head matchups. The final was held at Delaware Field House on the campus of the University of Delaware. Delaware gained its first overall America East Conference Championship and an automatic berth to the NCAA tournament with its win over Drexel. Delaware was given the 13th seed in the Midwest Regional of the NCAA Tournament and lost in the first round to Cincinnati 85–47.

Bracket and Results

See also
America East Conference

References

America East Conference men's basketball tournament
1991–92 North Atlantic Conference men's basketball season